Darwinia polycephala is a plant in the myrtle family Myrtaceae and is endemic to Western Australia.

Darwinia polycephala was first formally described in 1924 by Charles Gardner in the Journal of the Royal Society of Western Australia. The specific epithet (polycephala) means "many-headed".

This darwinia is often found on flat areas and around the margins of salt lakes in the Mallee bioregion of southern Western Australia. It is listed as "Priority Four" by the Government of Western Australia Department of Biodiversity, Conservation and Attractions, meaning that it is rare or near threatened.

References

polycephala
Endemic flora of Western Australia
Myrtales of Australia
Rosids of Western Australia
Plants described in 1925
Taxa named by Charles Gardner